Eriphus smaragdinus is a species of beetle in the family Cerambycidae. It was described by Monné & Fragoso in 1996.

References

Eriphus
Beetles described in 1996